Sinomonas soli is a strictly aerobic and non-motile bacterium from the genus Sinomonas which has been isolated from forest soil from the Anhui Province in China.

References

Bacteria described in 2012
Micrococcaceae